Henriksen is a Scandinavian patronymic surname, meaning son of Henrik.

Notable people 
Arve Henriksen (born 1968), Norwegian trumpet player
Bjarne Henriksen (born 1959), Danish actor
Bjarne Henry Henriksen (1904–1995), Norwegian politician
Bruce Henricksen (born 1941) American author and academic
Bo Henriksen (born 1975), Danish footballer
Clifford A. Henricksen, (born 1943), American inventor
Gustav Henriksen (1872–1939), Norwegian businessperson 
Hans Christian Henriksen (1909–1983), Norwegian businessperson 
Hans Herman Henriksen (born 1958), Norwegian footballer
Henriette Henriksen (born 1970), Norwegian team handball player and Olympic medalist
Johan R. Henriksen (1886–1975), Norwegian Nordic skier
Kai G. Henriksen (born 1956), Norwegian businessperson, politician, Vinmonopolet CEO
Kari Henriksen (born 1955), Norwegian politician
Kim J. Henriksen (born 1960), Danish Esperantist
Kjell Henriksen (1938–1996), Norwegian physicist
Kristian Henriksen (1911–2004), Norwegian footballer and coach
Lance Henriksen (born 1940), American actor
Leonardo Henrichsen (1940–1973), Argentine and Swedish photojournalist
Markus Henriksen (born 1992), Norwegian footballer
Olaf Henriksen (1888–1962), Danish baseball player
Ole Henriksen (born 1951), Danish skin specialist
Per Rune Henriksen (born 1960), Norwegian politician
Peter Henriksen (born 1972), Danish team handball player
Rein Henriksen (1915–1994), Norwegian lawyer and industrialist
René Henriksen (born 1969), Danish footballer
Soren Henriksen (born 1964), Danish cricketer
Sophus Henrichsen (1845–1928), Norwegian physicist
Tony Henriksen (born 1973), Danish football goalkeeper
Tor Arne Lau Henriksen, Norwegian military officer
Trond Henriksen (born 1964), Norwegian footballer
Vera Henriksen (1927–2016), Norwegian author

See also
Henriksson
Hinrichsen

Danish-language surnames
Norwegian-language surnames
Patronymic surnames
Surnames from given names